Joseph Park may refer to:

Joseph Park (businessman), American entrepreneur
Joseph Park (wrestler), a ring name of Christopher Joseph Park